Cyana pretoriae is a moth of the family Erebidae. It was described by William Lucas Distant in 1897. It is found in the Democratic Republic of the Congo, Kenya, Lesotho, Malawi, Mozambique, Somalia, South Africa, Tanzania, Uganda, Zambia and Zimbabwe.

Subspecies
Cyana pretoriae pretoriae
Cyana pretoriae spectabilis Karisch & Dall'Asta, 2010 (Democratic Republic of the Congo)

References

Cyana
Moths described in 1897
Insects of the Democratic Republic of the Congo
Moths of Africa